The 12th Armoured Brigade Combat team, formerly the 12th Armoured Infantry Brigade, is a regular brigade of the British Army which has been in almost continuous existence since 1899 and now forms part of 3rd (United Kingdom) Division.

History

Second Boer War
The brigade was first formed in December 1899 as 12th Infantry Brigade and saw action at the Battle of Rensburg, Battle of Norval's Point, Battle of Biddulph's Berg and Battle of Slabbert's Nek.

First World War
During the First World War, the 12th Brigade, a regular army formation, was assigned to the 4th Infantry Division. It was dispatched to France, crossing the English Channel on 22 August 1914, as part of the British Expeditionary Force (BEF) and saw action in the First Battle of the Marne beginning in September 1914. It then spent much of the rest of the conflict engaged in trench warfare.

Order of battle
The 12th Brigade was constituted as follows during the war:
1st Battalion, King's Own (Royal Lancaster Regiment)
2nd Battalion, Lancashire Fusiliers
2nd Battalion, Essex Regiment
2nd Battalion, Duke of Wellington's (West Riding Regiment) (from January 1916 to 10th Brigade February 1918)
2nd Battalion, Royal Irish Regiment (from March 1915, to 11th Brigade July 1915)
1/5th Battalion, South Lancashire Regiment (from February 1915 until January 1916)
1/2nd Battalion, Monmouthshire Regiment (until January 1916)

From early November 1915 until February 1916 the 12th Brigade was swapped with the 107th (Ulster) Brigade of the 36th (Ulster) Division.

Second World War

During the Second World War, except for a few brief periods of detachment, the brigade formed part of the 4th Infantry Division, as in the First World War. It was part of the British Expeditionary Force (BEF) and took part in Battle of France and the subsequent Dunkirk evacuation in May–June 1940.

The brigade remained in the United Kingdom for the next two years, preparing and training to repel Operation Sea Lion, the German invasion of England, although that never arrived. It moved to North Africa in February 1943 to take part in the later stages of the Tunisian Campaign and saw action at the Battle of Oved Zara, the Battle of Medjez Plain and the Battle of Tunis. It then took part in the Italian Campaign, moving to Naples in February 1944 and saw further action at the Fourth Battle of Monte Cassino. By October 1944 the 4th Division was taking part in the British Eighth Army's battle on the Gothic Line but was withdrawn in November to spend the rest of the war in Greece, part of the Allied force tasked to prevent civil unrest as rival factions attempted to fill the political vacuum when the Germans withdrew from the country.

Order of battle
The 12th Infantry Brigade was constituted as follows during the war:
 2nd Battalion, Royal Fusiliers
 1st Battalion, South Lancashire Regiment (until June 1940)
 1st Battalion, Black Watch (until March 1940)
 6th Battalion, Black Watch (from March 1940)
 1st Battalion, Queen's Own Royal West Kent Regiment (from September 1940)

Post-1945
The brigade was disbanded in March 1947, but reformed from 91 Lorried Infantry Brigade in April 1956. During the 1970s, it was one of two "square" brigades assigned to 2nd Armoured Division. After being briefly converted to "Task Force Delta" in the late 1970s, the brigade was reinstated in 1981, assigned to 1st Armoured Division and based at Quebec Barracks at Osnabrück. It remained with 1st Armoured Division, apart from a spell under HQ 3rd Armoured Division during Operation Granby, until disbandment under Options for Change. Following the Strategic Defence Review in 1998, the brigade was reformed in mechanized form under 3rd Mechanised Division at Aldershot Garrison: it relocated to Ward Barracks in Bulford Camp in February 2004.

Future 
Under the Future Soldier programme, the brigade has been redesignated as the 12th Armoured Brigade Combat Team, and in the future will control a reconnaissance regiment equipped with the General Dynamics Ajax.  The current armoured regiment (RTR) will be re-equipped with the Challenger 3 MBT and the armoured infantry battalions with the Warrior IFV re-equipped with the Boxer AFV.

Current Organisation
The current organisation of the brigade under the Defence in a Competitive Age is:

 12th Armoured Infantry Brigade Headquarters, at Bulford Barracks, Bulford Garrison
 Royal Tank Regiment, at Aliwal Barracks, Tidworth
 Kings Royal Hussars, at Aliwal Barracks, Tidworth Garrison
 1st Battalion, Royal Welsh, at Lucknow Barracks, Tidworth Garrison (Armoured Infantry)
 1st Battalion, Mercian Regiment, at Picton Barracks, Bulford Garrison (Armoured Infantry)
 3rd Battalion, Royal Welsh, Battalion HQ in Cardiff, Wales (Army Reserve – Armoured Infantry, paired with 1 R WELSH)
 4th Battalion, Mercian Regiment, Battalion HQ in Wolverhampton, West Midlands (Army Reserve – Armoured Infantry, paired with 1 MERCIAN)
 4 Regiment, Royal Logistic Corps, at Dalton Barracks, Abingdon

Brigade Commanders
Brigade commanders have included:
 Brigadier-General Charles E. Bradley: March 1907 – July 1909
 Brigadier-General Francis S. Inglefield: July 1909 – June 1912
 Brigadier-General Henry F.M. Wilson: June 1912 – September 1914
 Lieutenant-Colonel Frederick G. Anley: September 1914 (acting)
 Brigadier-General Henry F. M. Wilson: September – October 1914
 Brigadier-General Frederick G. Anley: October 1914 – June 1916
 Brigadier-General James D. Crosbie: June 1916 – January 1917
 Brigadier-General Adrian Carton de Wiart: January – November 1917
 Lieutenant-Colonel H. W. Glenn: November 1917 (acting)
 Brigadier-General Edward A. Fagan: November 1917 – October 1918
 Brigadier-General E.B. Macnaghten: October 1918 – 1919
 Brigadier-General Arthur H. Marindin: November 1919 – November 1923
 Brigadier-General Neville J.G. Cameron: November 1923 – October 1925
 Brigadier-General Edward B. Hankey: October 1925 – October 1929
 Brigadier Sir Hereward Wake, Bt.: October 1929 – August 1932
 Brigadier Charles A. Howard: August 1932 – July 1935
 Brigadier Martin Kemp-Welsh: July 1935 – August 1936
 Brigadier the Hon. P. Gerald Scarlett: August 1936 – September 1938
 Brigadier John G.W. Clark: September 1938 – October 1939
 Brigadier John L.I. Hawkesworth: October 1939 – June 1940
 Brigadier Daniel M.W. Beak: June 1940 – December 1941
 Brigadier Robert G.W. Callaghan: December 1941 – April 1943
 Brigadier Richard A. Hull: April–June 1943
 Brigadier Gordon H.A. MacMillan: June 1943
 Brigadier Thomas P.D. Scott: July–November 1943
 Brigadier F.M. Elliott: November 1943 – April 1944
 Brigadier Algernon G.W. Heber-Percy: April 1944–
 Brigadier Cyril E.H. Dolphin: 1949–1950
 Brigadier Frederick Stephens: -December 1950
 Brigadier Victor D.G. Campbell: December 1950 – November 1952
 Brigadier John F.M. Macdonald: November 1952 – 1954
 Brigadier Alfred (John) Tilly: 1954–1955
 Brigadier Ian H. Freeland: April 1956 – November 1957
 Brigadier Patrick H. Man: 1959 – March 1962
 Brigadier Philip T. Tower: March 1962 – 1964
 Brigadier Walter B. Thomas: 1964–1966
 Brigadier H. Mark G. Bond: 1966 – December 1968
 Brigadier W.G. Hugh Beach: December 1968 – September 1970
 Brigadier David T. Young: September 1970 – September 1972
 Brigadier Walter R. Taylor: September 1972 – December 1974
 Brigadier Michael F. Reynolds: December 1974 – December 1976
 Brigadier John C.O.R. Hopkinson: December 1976 – December 1978
 Brigadier Brian L.G. Kenny: December 1978 – December 1980
 Brigadier Charles A. Ramsay: December 1980 – December 1982
 Brigadier Peter R. Davies: December 1982 – November 1984
 Brigadier Jeremy J.G. Mackenzie: November 1984 – 1986
 Brigadier G. Hyde: 1986 – December 1988
 Brigadier Jonathan M.F.C. Hall: December 1988 – November 1990
 Brigadier Timothy J. Granville-Chapman: November 1990 – January 1993
 Brigadier John Cooper: November 1999 – January 2002
 Brigadier the Hon. Jonathan D. Shaw: January 2002 – April 2003
 Brigadier Christopher G.S. Hughes: April 2003 – June 2005
 Brigadier John G. Lorimer: June 2005 – November 2007
 Brigadier David M. Cullen: November 2007 – December 2009
 Brigadier Justin C.W. Maciejewski: December 2009 – September 2011
 Brigadier Douglas M. Chalmers: September 2011 – September 2013
 Brigadier C. Roland V. Walker: October 2013 – July 2015
 Brigadier Robin C.N. Sergeant: July 2015–

References

Sources

Further reading

External links
 12th Armoured Infantry Brigade 
 British Army 1939

Infantry brigades of the British Army in World War I
Infantry brigades of the British Army in World War II
Military units and formations established in 1899
Military units and formations of the United Kingdom in the War in Afghanistan (2001–2021)
Organisations based in Wiltshire
1899 establishments in the United Kingdom
Future Soldier